Historical statistics for football in the Pacific Coast Conference (PCC, 1915-1959), Athletic Association of Western Universities (AAWU, 1959–68), Pacific-8 (1968–78), Pacific-10 (1978-2011), and Pac-12 Conference (2011–present).

Season finishes

References

statistics